Terry Bobby Gene Pearson (born November 10, 1971) is former Major League Baseball pitcher. Prior to his stint with the Tigers, Pearson attended Pickens Academy High School in Carrollton, Alabama and Livingston University, since renamed the University of West Alabama.

References

External links

1971 births
Living people
Baseball players from Alabama
Detroit Tigers players
Major League Baseball pitchers
Zanesville Greys players
Sioux Falls Canaries players
Duluth-Superior Dukes players
Erie SeaWolves players
Toledo Mud Hens players
Nashua Pride players